Red Post is a crossroads near Launcells in Cornwall, England. It is on the A3072 Holsworthy to Stratton road where it is crossed by the B3254 road.

References

Roads in England
Geography of Cornwall